Major Andrew Stewart (1913–1989) was a Scottish rugby union player. He was the 76th President of the Scottish Rugby Union.

Rugby Union career

Amateur career

He played for Jed-Forest. He captained the club.

He took part in one post Second World War match for Jed-Forest and stated it took a fortnight to recover. He then quit as a player.

Provincial career

He played for South of Scotland District against North of Scotland District.

Administrative career

He became President of Jed-Forest in 1952.

He was elected on the SRU committee in 1954 as a South of Scotland District representative. He gave up the President post at Jed-Forest when he joined the SRU.

He was elected Vice-President of the SRU in 1961.

He became the 76th President of the Scottish Rugby Union. He served the standard one year from 1962 to 1963.

Stewart looked forward to the role: 'It will be fine to have the chance of assuring some of the smaller clubs that they are not in the wilderness.'

Outside of rugby

Stewart was a tweed manufacturer in Jedburgh.

He served as a Major in the 4th King's Own Scottish Borderers.

Both his uncle Charles William Stewart and father George Stewart played for Jed-Forest. His father was also a secretary and president of the club.

References

1913 births
1989 deaths
Scottish rugby union players
Presidents of the Scottish Rugby Union
Jed-Forest RFC players
South of Scotland District (rugby union) players
Rugby union players from Jedburgh
Rugby union centres